was a town located in Kōka District, Shiga Prefecture, Japan. "Kōsei" means "western Kōka". As of 2003, the town had an estimated population of 42,471 and a density of 743.02 persons per km2. The total area was 57.16 km2. On October 1, 2004, Kōsei merged with the town of Ishibe (also from Kōka District) to create the city of Konan. Its sister city was St. Johns, Michigan in United States.

References

Dissolved municipalities of Shiga Prefecture
Konan, Shiga